Yolanda, the Black Corsair's Daughter is a 1905 adventure novel written by Italian novelist Emilio Salgari. It is the third installment of The Black Corsair series, preceded by The Queen of the Caribbean and followed by Son of the Red Corsair.

Plot summary 
Henry Morgan has taken the place of his mentor, the Black Corsair, as the foremost privateer in the Caribbean. He discovers that Yolanda, the daughter of the now deceased Black Corsair, has been imprisoned in Maracaibo by her half-uncle, the Count of Medina and Torres, an illegitimate son of Wan Guld who wants to appropriate his father's estate, which had never been returned to Honorata, the Black Corsair's wife. Morgan decides to rescue her out of gratitude towards her father, and eventually the two fall in love. After defeating the Count, the two get married as he's appointed Governor of Jamaica.

Film adaptation 
The novel was first adapted in 1920 by Vitale de Stefano as Jolanda, la figlia del corsaro nero. A second adaption was made in 1952 as Jolanda, the Daughter of the Black Corsair, directed by Mario Soldati. An animated cartoon series was also broadcast in 1999.

See also 

Novels in the Sandokan series:
 The Mystery of the Black Jungle
 The Tigers of Mompracem
 The Pirates of Malaysia
 The Two Tigers
 The King of the Sea
 Quest for a Throne

Novels in The Black Corsair series:
 The Black Corsair
 The Queen of the Caribbean
 Yolanda, the Black Corsair's Daughter
 Son of the Red Corsair

The Captain Tempesta novels:

 Captain Tempesta
 The Lion of Damascus

1905 novels